Piccoli fuochi (also known internationally as Little Flames) is a 1985 Italian drama film directed by Peter Del Monte and starring Dino Jaksic and Valeria Golino in her very first leading role. Golino won a Globo d'oro for Best Breakthrough Actress for her performance in the film.

Plot summary  
The Italian childhood fantasy Little Flames (Piccoli Fuochi) concerns 5-year-old Dino Jakosic. 
Proving too much for his parents, Jakosic is often sent to his room, where he interacts with several bizarre "imaginary" playmates who bedevil the servants with their sadistic pranks (the audience is never certain whether the playmates are real or whether the boy is pulling off the pranks himself). 
Valeria Golino plays Mara, the family's new maid, whom Jakosic takes a liking to. He begs his playmates to leave Mara alone, but out of jealousy they plan an awful revenge on the poor woman.

Cast 
 Valeria Golino: Mara
 Dino Jaksic: Tommaso 
 Ulisse Minervini: Franci   
 Carlotta Wittig: Ada 
 Mario Garriba: Leo  
 Daniela Giordano:
 Simona Tedeschi:

References

External links 
 
 Piccoli Fuochi at Allmovie

1985 films
1980s Italian-language films
Italian drama films
Films directed by Peter Del Monte
Juvenile sexuality in films
Italian coming-of-age films
1980s Italian films